Aquí Paz y después Gloria is a Spanish comedy television series that originally aired from March to August 2015 on Telecinco. It stars Antonio Resines, Antonio Molero, César Sarachu, Mónica Estarreado and Nazaret Jiménez Aragón, among others.

Premise 
The fiction revolves around the mishaps in a Catholic parish church, primarily featuring the stories of two priests (one of whom is impersonated by his twin brother, a scoundrel) and a bishop.

Cast

Production and release 
Tentatively titled as He visto un ángel during the early production stages, Aquí Paz y después Gloria was produced by Mediaset in collaboration with Producciones Mandarina. The pilot of He visto un ángel, directed by Fernando Colomo, and starring the likes of Antonio Resines, María Barranco, Miguel Rellán, Lilian Caro, Elena Rivera, Julieta Serrano and Enrique Villén, left the Telecinco authorities unconvinced and the series was remade, featuring a new title and a revamped cast.

Joaquín Llamas, Jaime Botella and María Cereceda directed the episodes.

The series premiered on prime time on Telecinco on 24 March 2015. While the first episode earned an excellent 20.7% audience share, viewership figures plummeted down to a 9.9% in the third episode, and the series was shelved after the fourth episode. Later in the year, in July 2015, Telecinco brought back the series for the broadcasting of the remaining four episodes, which performed even worse. The broadcasting run ended on 10 August 2015 with the airing of the last episode of the season, which earned a miserable 6.0% audience share.

See also 
 2015 in Spanish television
 List of programs broadcast by Telecinco

References 

Spanish-language television shows
2010s Spanish comedy television series
2015 Spanish television series debuts
2015 Spanish television series endings
Telecinco network series
Television shows about Catholicism
Television series by Producciones Mandarina